William Selvamurthy is an Indian scientist, currently working with Amity University, Raipur, as President of Amity Science, Technology and Innovation Foundation and Director General for Amity Directorate of Science and Innovation. He previously served as a Chief Controller, Research & Development (Life Sciences & International Cooperation) at the Defence Research and Development Organisation for the Indian government.

He is leading research and development for improvements to the health and wellbeing of the armed forces.

Education
He did his post-graduation in Human Physiology from Christian Medical College, Vellore (1972) and PhD from University of Delhi (1982) and Doctorate of Science (DSc) from Swami Vivekananda Yoga Anusandhana Samsthana Deemed University in Bangalore (2006). Recently he was awarded the Degree of Doctor of Science (DSc) (Honoris Causa) in recognition of his contributions to the field of science and his distinctive place in the scientific world by Fakir Mohan University, Balasore (2008). He was awarded another further honorary degrees of Doctor of Science (DSc) from Bharathiar University, Coimbatore (2009), Amity University (2011) and Karunya University (2011).

Career
Selvamurthy joined the Defence Research and Development Organisation (DRDO) in 1973 and served there for 40 years, during which time he became Director of two DRDO institutes: the Defence Institute of Physiology and Allied Sciences (DIPAS), and the Defence Institute of Psychological Research (DIPR). He took the latter role in 1992 and held it for over 10 years. His research contributions while working at DRDO included:
 Physiological acclimatisation at high altitude
 Application of yoga for the Armed forces
 Development of a drug to save war casualties subjected to severe hemorrhage
 Psychological stress and its management
 Life support systems for soldiers in extreme operational environments

Selvamurthy joined Amity in 2013 as President (Honorary) of the Amity Science, Technology and Innovation Foundation. He was awarded the Thangam Vasudevan Research Prize by the Indian Association of Biomedical Award Scientists in 1981, and was a fellow of the National Academy of Medical Sciences.

Books
 Contributions to Human Biometeorology edited by W. Selvamurthy (1987) 
 Brain & Psychophysiology of Stress edited by W. Selvamurthy, K. N. Sharma and N. Battacharya (1988)
 Compendium of DIPAS Projects edited by W. Selvamurthy, K. Sridharan and L. Mathew (1988)
 Biometeorology, Vol 9, Part-I (Abstracts) edited by W. Selvamurthy, S. C. Pandeya and H. Lieth (1983)
 Stress Physiology edited by W. Selvamurthy, K. Sridharan and B. N. Chaudhari (1989)
 Advance in Physiological Sciences edited by W. Selvamurthy, S. K. Manchanda and V. Mohan Kumar (1992)
 Physiology of Human Performance edited by W. Selvamurthy, Kadambi Sridharan and Ramesh C. Sawhney (1994)
 Meditation edited by W. Selvamurthy, Ramesh C. Sawhney and Lajpat Rai (1999)
 Human Food edited by W. Selvamurthy, Ramesh C. Sawhney, Lajpat Rai and B. Bhatia (1999)
 Battle Scene in Year 2020 edited by W. Selvamurthy, P. N. Chaudhari (1999)
 Rosary of Lord's Name edited by W. Selvamurthy, Ramesh C. Sawhney and Lajpat Rai (1999)
 Advances in Ergonomics, Occupational Health and Safety edited by W. Selvamurthy and D. Majumdar (2000) 
 Body Measurement : Design Application & Body Composition edited by W. Selvamurthy, T. Zachariah, S. Kishnani and S. N. Pramanik (2001)
 Soaring High: A Biography of V. K. Aatre by K. Divyananda and W. Selvamurthy (2005) 
 High Altitude Cold Arid Agro Animal Technology edited by W. Selvamurthy, R. B. Srivastava (2011)

References

1949 births
Defence Research and Development Organisation
Indian pharmacologists
Indian Tamil academics
Living people
Scientists from Tamil Nadu
Delhi University alumni
Fellows of the National Academy of Medical Sciences
People from Virudhunagar district
Tamil scientists
Indian nuclear medicine physicians
Indian scientific authors